Moro railway station 
(Sindhi: مورو ريلوي اسٽيشن) is  located in Moro, Sindh, Pakistan.

See also
 List of railway stations in Pakistan
 Pakistan Railways

References

External links

Railway stations in Naushahro Feroze District